The 2016–17 Seattle Redhawks men's basketball team represented Seattle University during the 2016–17 NCAA Division I men's basketball season. The Redhawks, led by eighth-year head coach Cameron Dollar, played their home games at KeyArena and six games at the Connolly Center as members of the Western Athletic Conference. They finished the season 13–17, 5–9 WAC play to finish in fifth place. Due to Grand Canyon's postseason ineligibility, they received the No. 4 seed in the WAC tournament where they lost in the quarterfinals to Utah Valley.

On March 13, 2017, the school fired head coach Cameron Dollar. His eight-year record at the school was 107–138. On March 29, the school hired Jim Hayford from in-state rival Eastern Washington as their new head coach.

Previous season
The Redhawks finished the 2015–16 season 15–17, 7–7 in WAC play to finish in fourth place. They defeated Texas–Rio Grande Valley in the quarterfinals of the WAC tournament before losing to Cal State Bakersfield in the semifinals. They were invited to the College Basketball Invitational where they defeated Idaho in the first round to advance to the quarterfinals where they lost to Vermont.

Offseason

Departures

Recruiting class of 2016

Roster

Schedule and results

|-
!colspan=9 style=| Non-conference regular season

|-
!colspan=9 style=| WAC regular season

|-
!colspan=9 style=| WAC tournament

References

Seattle Redhawks men's basketball seasons
Seattle
Seattle Redhawks
Seattle Redhawks
Seattle Redhawks
Seattle Redhawks